Brita Maret "Sofia" Jannok (born 15 September 1982) is a Swedish Sami artist, singer, songwriter and radio host. Several times, she has publicly taken a stance in social media against the establishment of mines on land used by Sami  reindeer herders. Together with Mariela Idivuoma, she was hostess of the Liet-Lávlut music festival in 2006. She has also hosted the program "Mailbmi – small people great music" on Swedish Radio P2, and the Sámi children's program Unna Junná for Yle. Her music is inspired from diverse musical influences, like folk, pop, jazz and yoik. She sings mostly in Northern Sami, but also sings and writes lyrics in Swedish and English as well.

Sofia previously performed with Anna Kärrstedt in the duo "Sophia and Anna". She performed in Melodifestivalen 2009 with the song Waterloo in Sámi ("Čáhcceloo"). On 30 June 2009 she was one of the summer guest hosts on Swedish Radio P1. The day after, 1 July, she participated in SVT's program from Skansen in Stockholm for the inauguration of the Swedish Presidency of the EU. At the opening meeting in the Parliament House in Stockholm on 15 September 2009, she performed "Samelands vidder".

From 23 to 30 May 2010 Jannok performed in various bars and clubs in Shanghai and Beijing, China. From 4 to 5 June 2010 she attended the Talvatis Festival in Cardiff.

During an inauguration of the Culture year in Umeå 2014 (Sami late winter) Sofia conducted a call of anti-racism with Cleo and Kristin Amparo before the performance of the song "Faller en, faller alla". On stage at the same time was also a group of left-wing anti-fascist activists wearing ski masks with the message "Free Joel" printed on their shirts, which alludes to the activist who was arrested and convicted for attempted manslaughter and rioting because of the riots in Kärrtorp, when a group of Neo-Nazis attacked a left-wing anti-racism demonstration.

Sofia performed at the first Sápmi Pride festival which took place in Kiruna in 2014 and was attended by 300 people.

Awards
In 2014, Jannok received the Áillohaš Music Award, a Sámi music award conferred by the municipality of Kautokeino and the Kautokeino Sámi Association to honor the significant contributions the recipient or recipients has made to the diverse world of Sámi music.

The same year she was nominated for a Swedish Grammy for Áhpi (Wide as Oceans).

Discography

Albums

Other appearances
2000: Dál juovlla čuovggaid cahkkehit (Sami Christmas CD)
2007: Ima ipmašat (children's CD, DAT) 
2007: Buoremus ájgge (children's CD, Mandy Senger & Sara Aira Fjällström)

Soundtracks
2000: *TV-musik ur dokumentärserien Samerna (Scandinavian Songs) 
2000: Great North (soundtrack, TVA International inc.)

Singles
2000: "Čalmmit" (as part of Sofia och Anna)
2004: "Liekkas clubmix" (promotional single, Publishment)

Music competitions
2001: Sámi Grand Prix 2001, Rieban 
2003: Sámi Grand Prix 2003, Rieban

In popular culture
Episode 5: Just Decide of Threshold Podcast Season Two featured the song "We are Still Here" from Jannok's album ORDA – This is My Land.

References

External links

Áillohaš Music Award winners
Swedish Sámi musicians
Swedish singer-songwriters
Swedish folk singers
Living people
1982 births
21st-century Swedish singers
21st-century Swedish women singers